"Red Silk Stockings and Green Perfume" is a pop song written in 1946 by Bob Hilliard, Sammy Mysels, and Dick Sanford (né Richard Young Sandford; 1896–1981).  The first version was by *Ray McKinley and his Orchestra

Other recorded versions
The song was recorded by many artists, among them:
It was a top-ten hit for Sammy Kaye in 1947
Roy Hogsed
The Crossroads Gang,
The Andrews Sisters. 
It was later recorded by Nelson Riddle (and released on his 1962 album Love is a Game of Poker)
Archie Campbell (and released on his 1966 album The Cockfight and Other Tall Tales.)

References

The Andrews Sisters songs
Songs with lyrics by Bob Hilliard